Zhubei railway station is a railway station located in Zhubei City, Hsinchu County, Taiwan. It is located on the West Coast line and is operated by Taiwan Railways.

Around the station
 Hsinchu County Government

References

1897 establishments in Taiwan
Railway stations in Hsinchu County
Railway stations opened in 1897
Railway stations served by Taiwan Railways Administration